Harry Horace Harman (June 5, 1913 – June 8, 1976) was a Polish-born American statistician known for his work on factor analysis. A fellow of the American Psychological Association, he served as president of the Psychometric Society from 1968 to 1969 and of the Society of Multivariate Experimental Psychology from 1974 to 1975. He died of a heart attack in Princeton, New Jersey, on June 8, 1976.

References

1913 births
1976 deaths
American statisticians
Fellows of the American Psychological Association
Polish emigrants to the United States
Psychometricians
University of Chicago alumni
Quantitative psychologists